The statvolt is a unit of voltage and electrical potential used in the CGS-ESU and gaussian systems of units. In terms of its relation to the SI units, one statvolt corresponds to exactly  , i.e. to 299.792458 volts. 

The statvolt is also defined in the CGS system as 1 erg / statcoulomb.

It is a useful unit for electromagnetism because, in a vacuum, an electric field of one statvolt per centimetre has the same energy density as a magnetic field of one gauss.  Likewise, a plane wave propagating in a vacuum has perpendicular electric and magnetic fields such that for every gauss of magnetic field intensity there is one statvolt/cm of electric field intensity.

In the CGS-EMU system, the unit of voltage is the abvolt.

Notes

References

Units of electrical potential
Centimetre–gram–second system of units